Cimoszka  is a settlement in the administrative district of Gmina Janów, within Sokółka County, Podlaskie Voivodeship, in north-eastern Poland.

The village is the birthplace of Polish mathematician Józef Marcinkiewicz.

References

Cimoszka